Navand (also Romanized as Nāvand) is a village in Zarjabad Rural District, Firuz District, Kowsar County, Ardabil Province, Iran. At the 2006 census, its population was 109, in 24 families.

References 

Tageo

Towns and villages in Kowsar County